The Iceland women's national basketball team represents Iceland in international women's basketball tournaments. They are controlled by the Icelandic Basketball Association.

Competitive record

Championship for Small Countries

Games of the Small States

Team

Current rosters
The following is the squad in the EuroBasket Women 2019 qualification.

Individual records

Players with the most caps (games played)
Players in bold, are players that are still active.

References

External links
Official website 
Iceland at FIBA site
Iceland National Team - Women at Eurobasket.com

Basketball
Women's national basketball teams
national